Attenborough Football club is a football club based in Attenborough, Nottinghamshire, England. The club is affiliated with the Nottinghamshire County Football Association.

History
The club was formed in 1947 and were originally called Attenborough St Marys. The club played in the Long Eaton League. In 1973 the club joined Division One of the Central Alliance, gaining promotion to the Premier division at the first attempt. Two seasons later in the 1975–76 season the club would win the Premier division.

The club joined division one of the Midland League for the 1976–77 season, and staying there until the end of the 1981–82 season. The 1983–84 season saw the club become one of the founding members of the Central Midlands League. After nine seasons the club joined Division Two of the Nottinghamshire Senior League. The 1995–96 season saw the club finish as runners-up in Division Two gaining promotion to Division One, the following season saw another promotion to the Senior Division where they have remained since.

Ground
The club play their home games at The Strand.

Honours
Central Alliance
 Premier Division Champions (1) 1975–76

Notts Intermediate Cup
 Winners (1) 2017–18

References

Football clubs in England
Football clubs in Nottinghamshire
Midland Football League (1889)
Central Midlands Football League
Nottinghamshire Senior League
Central Alliance
1947 establishments in England
Association football clubs established in 1947